Poonacha is a surname. Notable people with the surname include:

Cheppudira Poonacha (born 1965), Indian field hockey player
C. M. Poonacha (1910–1990), Indian politician 
Harshika Poonacha (born 1993), Indian actress

Indian surnames